Kenneth Matthew Mower is an English former professional footballer who played as a full back, making over 400 career appearances.

Career
Born in Bloxwich, Mower began his career with Streetly Youth Club. He joined Walsall in June 1976, turned professional in November 1978, and made his debut in the Football League in May 1979. He made a total of 415 appearances in the League for Walsall, before playing non-League football with Nuneaton Borough, Stafford Rangers, Bilston Town and Blakenall.

References

1960 births
Living people
People from Bloxwich
English footballers
Association football fullbacks
Walsall F.C. players
Nuneaton Borough F.C. players
Stafford Rangers F.C. players
Bilston Town F.C. players
Blakenall F.C. players
English Football League players